, or ISAS, is a Japanese national research organization of astrophysics using rockets, astronomical satellites and interplanetary probes which played a major role in Japan's space development. Since 2003, it is a division of Japan Aerospace Exploration Agency (JAXA).

History 

The ISAS originated as part of the Institute of Industrial Science of the University of Tokyo (:ja: 東京大学生産技術研究所), where Hideo Itokawa experimented with miniature solid-fuel rockets (Pencil Rocket and ) in the 1950s. This experimentation eventually led to the development of the Κ (Kappa) sounding rocket, which was used for observations during the International Geophysical Year (IGY). By 1960, the Κ-8 rocket had reached an altitude of 200 km.

In 1964, the rocket group and the Institute of Aeronautics, along with scientific ballooning team, were merged to form  within the University of Tokyo. The rocket evolved into the L (Lambda) series, and, in 1970, L-4S-5 was launched as Japan's first artificial satellite Ohsumi.

Although Lambda rockets were only sounding rockets, the next generation of M (Mu) rockets was intended to be satellite launch vehicles from the start. Beginning in 1971, ISAS launched a series of scientific satellites to observe the ionosphere and magnetosphere. Since the launch of Hakucho in 1979, ISAS has had X-ray astronomy satellites consecutively in orbit, until it was briefly terminated by the launch failure of ASTRO-E.

In 1981, as a part of university system reform, and for the mission expansion, ISAS was spun out from University of Tokyo as an inter-university national research organization, Institute of Space and Astronautical Science.

ISAS was responsible for launching Japan's first interplanetary probes, Sakigake and Suisei, to Halley's Comet in 1985. It also launched Hiten, Japan's first lunar probe, in 1990. The Nozomi probe was launched in 1998 in an attempt to orbit Mars, but the spacecraft suffered system failures and was unable to enter orbit. In 2003, ISAS launched the Hayabusa spacecraft, the first asteroid sample return mission in the world.

Later in 2003, three national aerospace organizations including ISAS were merged to form Japan Aerospace Exploration Agency (JAXA). The English name Institute of Space and Astronautical Science is still used, although the Japanese name was changed to 宇宙科学研究本部 (literally, Space Science Research Division, whereas the previous name's literal translation was Space Science Laboratory).  In 2010, the name was changed back to the previous . Under JAXA, ISAS continues to be responsible for space-based astronomy, and lunar and planetary exploration missions.

List of spacecraft by ISAS

Before establishment of JAXA

After establishment of JAXA

Future missions

See also 

 Comet Interceptor, a Europe-led mission with contributions from ISAS
 HIMES
 IKAROS, a solar sail spacecraft
 Lunar Polar Exploration Mission, a future lunar lander
 OMOTENASHI, a planned lunar lander
 PROCYON and EQUULEUS, deep space probes developed with University of Tokyo
 Reusable Vehicle Testing
 SELENE-2
 SFU, a joint mission with NASDA

References

External links 

 Official website
 From Pencil to M-V — History of Rocket Development - Official JAXA YouTube Channel (in Japanese)

JAXA
Aerospace
Research institutes in Japan
Aerospace research institutes
Scientific organizations established in 1981
1981 establishments in Japan
Sagamihara
University of Tokyo